Howrah - SMVT Bengaluru Humsafar Express is a superfast express train of the Indian Railways connecting Sir M. Visvesvaraya Terminal in Karnataka and Howrah Junction in West Bengal . It is currently being operated with 22887/22888 train numbers on a weekly basis.

Coach Composition 

The trains is completely 3-tier AC sleeper trains designed by Indian Railways with features of LED screen display to show information about stations, train speed etc. and will have announcement system as well, Vending machines for tea, coffee and milk, Bio toilets in compartments as well as CCTV cameras.

Service

It averages 60 km/hr as 22887 Humsafar Express starts on Tuesday and covering 1970 km in 32 hrs 55 mins & 60 km/hr as 22888 Humsafar Express starts on Thursday covering 1968 km in 32 hrs 35 mins.

Schedule

22887 - Starts from Howrah Jn on every Tuesday at 12:40 Hrs IST and reach Sir M. Visvesvaraya Terminal next Day 20:00 Hrs IST

22888 - Starts from Sir M. Visvesvaraya Terminal every Thursday at 10:15 Hrs IST and reach Howrah Jn  next day at 18:30 Hrs

Route & Halts

Reverse

Train reverse at Visakhapatnam station

RSA - Rake Sharing

20889/20890 - Howrah - Tirupati Humsafar Express

Traction

Both trains are hauled by a  based WAP 7 electric locomotives from  till . From  till  it is hauled by a  based WAP 7 electric locomotives and vice versa.

See also 

 Humsafar Express
 Howrah Junction railway station
 Yesvantpur Junction railway station
 Bhubaneswar - Krishnarajapuram Humsafar Express
 Agartala–SMVT Bengaluru Humsafar Express

Notes

References

External links 
22887/Howrah - Yesvantpur HumSafar Express
22888/Yesvantpur - Howrah HumSafar Express

Humsafar Express trains
Rail transport in West Bengal
Rail transport in Odisha
Rail transport in Andhra Pradesh
Rail transport in Tamil Nadu
Rail transport in Karnataka
Trains from Howrah Junction railway station
Rail transport in Howrah
Transport in Bangalore
Railway services introduced in 2017